Khongyam is a small village situated within the Kakching district in the Indian state of Manipur. It is located about 66 Km to the south of Imphal.

See also
 Sugnu
 Chajing Khunou
 Wangoo

References

External links

Villages in Kakching district